Sheikh Sharaf ad-Dīn ibn al-Hasan was the son and religious heir of al-Hasan ibn ‘Adī and thus head of the ‘Adawiyya order. He died in battle against the Mongols in 1258 and was succeeded by his uncle, Fakhr ad-Dīn ibn ‘Adī. Due to the hostility of the Mongols, his son Zayn ed Din preferred not to become his successor and passed on the duties to Fakhr ad-Dīn ibn ‘Adī, who was married to a Mongol.    

The Sherfedin sanctuary is considered to be one of the oldest and most important Yazidi holy sites. Sherfedin is particularly revered in the Sinjar region.

The Yazidi Qewlê Şerfedîn ("Hymn of Şerfedîn") identifies Şerfedîn with the Mahdi. In the hymn (qewl), Şerfedîn is currently staying in a cave and will emerge at the end of times.

See also
List of Yazidi holy figures
List of Yazidi holy places
Sharfadin Temple

References

1258 deaths
Year of birth unknown
Yazidi mythology
Adawiyya Sufi Order
Yazidi holy figures